Siddiq Barmak (born September 7, 1962) is an Afghan film director and producer. In 2004, Barmak won Best Foreign Language Film at the Golden Globes for his first feature film, Osama. He received an M.A. degree in cinema direction from the Moscow Film Institute (VGIK) in 1987.

Osama
There is a stylistic echo in Osama featured in Afghan films by the Iranian Makhmalbaf dynasty. Barmak directed Osama with significant funding and assistance from Mohsen Makhmalbaf. The Iranian director invested in the film, lending Barmak his Arriflex camera and encouraging him to send the movie to international festivals, which eventually generated further funding from Japanese and Irish producers. Barmak received "UNESCO’s Fellini Silver Medal" for his drama, Osama, in 2003.

Afghan Children Education Movement
Barmak is also director of the Afghan Children Education Movement (ACEM), an association that promotes literacy, culture and the arts, which was also founded by Makhmalbaf. The school trains actors and directors for newly emerging Afghan cinema.
Barmak is one of the celebrated figures in Persian cinema as well as the  emerging cinema of Afghanistan.

Filmography
He has written screenplays and has made short films and produced a number of films.

Divar - (1984) director
Circle - (1985) director
Bigana - (1987) director
Uruj - (1996) director
Osama - (2003) director
Kurbani - (2004) executive producer
Earth and Ashes - (2004) co-producer
Opium War - (2008) director
Apple from Paradise  (2008) - producer
Neighbor (2009) executive producer

References

External links

1962 births
Living people
Afghan film directors
Afghan Tajik people
Persian-language film directors
Gerasimov Institute of Cinematography alumni